Aggelos (meaning Messenger) are a Colombian Christian metal band that makes unblack metal, doom metal, gothic metal, death metal, symphonic metal, black metal, and neoclassical metal music. They started making music together in 2002 and have released two studio albums, Mantos Purpúreos (2011) and Silentium (2016), the latter with Rottweiler Records.

Background
The band originated in Medellín, Colombia, where they formed in 2002. The current members are vocalist and guitarist, Natalia Soto; vocalist and bassist, Carolina Giraldo Sánchez; vocalist, Juan Esteban Londoño; guitarist and keyboardist, Jonathan Rueda; and drummer, Duvan Lopez Posada. Past members were vocalist, Lady Diana Miranda; drummer Johana Gallego; and guitarist, Milgan Narvaez.

Music history
Their first studio album, Mantos Purpúreos, was released in 2011. The band is signed to Rottweiler Records. On 11 March 2016, they released Silentium, a second studio album.

Members
Current members
 Natalia Soto – vocals, guitar (2002–present)
 Carolina Giraldo Sánchez – vocals, bass (2002–present)
 Juan Esteban Londoño – vocals (2006–present)
 Jonathan Rueda – guitar, keys (2002–present)
 Duvan Lopez Posada – drums (2011–present)

Former members
 Lady Diana Miranda – vocals (2002-2010)
 Johana Gallego – drums (2002-2010)
 Milgan Narváez – guitar

Discography
Studio albums
 Mantos Purpúreos (2011)
 Silentium (11 March 2016, Rottweiler)

References

External links

Colombian heavy metal musical groups
Musical groups established in 2002
Rottweiler Records artists